Claudia Porwik and Irina Spîrlea were the defending champions but did not compete that year.

Rika Hiraki and Naoko Kijimuta won in the final 7–6, 7–5 against Laurence Courtois and Nancy Feber.

Seeds
Champion seeds are indicated in bold text while text in italics indicates the round in which those seeds were eliminated.

 Kerry-Anne Guse /  Kristine Radford (semifinals)
 Yayuk Basuki /  Linda Wild (semifinals)
 Laurence Courtois /  Nancy Feber (final)
 Karin Kschwendt /  Rene Simpson (first round)

Draw

External links
 1996 Danamon Open Doubles draw

Danamon Open
1996 WTA Tour